Howard Gaye (23 May 1878 – 26 December 1955) was a British actor who worked mainly in the United States.
He acted in 27 silent films, including D. W. Griffith's epics The Birth of a Nation (1915) as Robert E. Lee and Intolerance (1916) as Jesus Christ.

Gaye also directed films for Mena.

In the early 1920s, Gaye taught acting at the Howard Gaye Studio of Screen Acting Technique. He said that even experienced stage actors needed to learn certain techniques if they wanted to adapt to acting in films.

Mann was charged with violating the Mann Act in May 1923. A federal complaint charged that he took "Fanchon Duncan, said to be a movie-struck girl" to England, brought her back to the United States, and then deserted her. He was released under $2,500 bond.

Partial filmography

 Home, Sweet Home (1914)
 The Birth of a Nation (1915) as Gen. Robert E. Lee
 Daphne and the Pirate (1916) as Prince Henri
 Flirting with Fate (1916) as Roland Dabney
 The Little School Ma'am (1916) as Old Man Tyler
 Intolerance (1916) as Jesus Christ / Cardinal de Lorraine
 The Devil's Needle (1916) as Sir Gordon Galloway
 Diane of the Follies (1916) as Don Livingston
 Everybody's Doing It (1916) as Society gentleman
 The Spirit of '76 (1917) as Lionel Esmond
 The Spy (1917) as Baron von Bergen
 The Scarlet Pimpernel (1917) as Lord Antony Dewhurst
 Restitution (1918) as Jesus, the man
 The Uplifters (1919) as Larry Holden
 An Adventure in Hearts (1919) as Paul Sharpe
 The Six Best Cellars (1920) as Tommy Blair
 Passion's Playground (1920) as James Hanaford
 A Slave of Vanity (1920) as Arthur Kane
 To Please One Woman (1920) as Leila's Husband
 My Lady's Latchkey (1921) as Lord Annesley-Seton
 What's a Wife Worth? (1921) as Henry Burton
 Sacred and Profane Love (1921) as Albert Vicary
 A Prince of Lovers (1922) as Lord Byron
 Scaramouche (1923) as Viscount d'Albert (uncredited)
 The Dancer of the Nile (1923) as Pharaoh
 Dante's Inferno (1924) as Virgil (final film role)

References

External links

 

1878 births
1955 deaths
English male silent film actors
20th-century English male actors
People from Hitchin
20th-century British male actors
British expatriate male actors in the United States